North Dock is a dock on the River Mersey at Garston, Liverpool, England. It is accessed from Old Dock, Garston, and is part of the Port of Garston. The direct curve from Allerton on the former St Helens and Runcorn Gap Railway opened on 1 January 1873 and the dock was completed in June 1875.

References

External links
 www.mersey-gateway.org
 1926 photo
 MultiMap photo

Garston docks
Mersey docks